Abishur Prakash (born September 21, 1991) is a Canadian expert on geopolitics and technology. He is a futurist at Center for Innovating the Future (CIF), a consulting firm located in Toronto, Canada.

Early life and education 
Prakash was born in New Zealand to parents from India. He had his childhood in Australia and grew up in Canada.

Prakash has a B.A. in "Politics and Governance" from Ryerson University.

Books 
Prakash is the author of five books that explore the future of geopolitics, globalization and technologies like artificial intelligence and 5G.

In 2016, he published his first book, Next Geopolitics: The Future of World Affairs (Technology) Volume One. In 2017, Prakash wrote a sequel titled Next Geopolitics: The Future of World Affairs (Technology) Volume Two. In this series, Prakash argues that, "World politics has now reached a turning point. Here, the advancement of technology will decide the issue of power. The role of conventional raw materials and resources such as oil, natural gas and money will be less dominant, replaced by robotics, artificial intelligence, virtual reality and genetic engineering. Under these circumstances, we will face completely different issues than we do now."

In 2018, Prakash published his third book, Go.AI (Geopolitics of Artificial Intelligence). The book argues that "artificial intelligence as a human construction can fundamentally change the geopolitical reality that has so far been based on natural endowments specifically independent of the will of Homo sapiens." Prakash's book was reviewed by the France-based think tank, French Institute of International Relations (IFRI), alongside Kai Fu Lee's “AI Superpowers: China, Silicon Valley, and the New World Order.” The book was also reviewed by Mandiner, Hetek and Origo (website). In 2019, Prakash wrote an op-ed adapted from his book for Scientific American titled "The Geopolitics of Artificial Intelligence." In 2020, Prakash wrote another op-ed adapted from the book for Nikkei Asia titled "It is time for G-20 to give way to tech-driven AI-20."

In 2020, Prakash published his fourth book, The Age of Killer Robots.

In 2021, Prakash published his fifth book, The World Is Vertical: How Technology Is Remaking Globalization.

Career 
In 2010, Prakash co-founded Center for Innovating the Future (CIF), a consulting practice based in Toronto, Canada. His work at CIF has been cited by the World Economic Forum, Brookings Institution, the Foreign Policy Research Institute and the Ministry of Foreign Affairs and International Cooperation (United Arab Emirates). In 2017, Prakash represented CIF in a public testimony to the Senate of Canada. During the 2020 US presidential election, Prakash proposed that technology would be the biggest factor for US-China relations going forward. In January 2021, CIF released an annual list where Prakash referred to 2020 as the transition year from "geopolitics governed by oil to one governed by technology.”

Bibliography 
 Next Geopolitics: The Future of World Affairs (Technology) Volume One (2016)  
 Next Geopolitics: The Future of World Affairs (Technology) Volume Two (2017)  
 Go.AI (Geopolitics of Artificial Intelligence) (2018)  
 The Age of Killer Robots (2020) 
 The World Is Vertical: How Technology Is Remaking Globalization (2021)

References 

1991 births
Living people
Writers about globalization
Toronto Metropolitan University alumni
Foreign policy writers
Futurologists
Canadian political scientists
Indian political scientists
21st-century Canadian male writers
Geopoliticians
Canadian people of Indian descent
Artificial intelligence researchers
Canadian management consultants
Canadian technology writers
Canadian futurologists